Dorsey Wright (born Jan 8th 1957) is an American actor, best known for his role as Cleon in the 1979 film The Warriors.

Biography
Wright was born in The Bronx, New York City on April 21, 1957, and earned his first acting role in 1979, in The Warriors, for which he is best remembered. He co-starred in the film version of Hair that same year. In 1981, he appeared as a gang member in the film Ragtime and played Junior Jones in the 1984 film adaptation of John Irving's novel The Hotel New Hampshire.

Dorsey Wright was, for a brief time, part of a not-for-profit theater group based in New York City, called the Theater for the Forgotten. The project was run by founders Akila Couloumbis and Beverly Rich, funded by The National Council for the Arts and several other sources. The brainchild of Akila Couloumbis, the group put on plays for the institutionalized, ranging from prisons and drug rehab to hospitals in six states for thirty years, a long run for a creative non-profit organization. Some of the plays were written in collaboration with the theater groups Dream 76 and Forever My Earth.

Wright now works for the New York Transit Authority and does voice-overs for television and radio commercials. In 2005, he reprised his role as Cleon in the video game version of The Warriors.

Filmography

Film

Television

Video games

References

External links
 

1957 births
Living people
20th-century American male actors
21st-century American male actors
Male actors from New York City
African-American male actors
American male film actors
American male voice actors
People from the Bronx
20th-century African-American people
21st-century African-American people